Dancing Under Streetlights, an EP, is the third and final release by The Brains. It was released in 1982.

Track listing

 "Dancing Under Streetlights"
 "Tanya" 
 "Read My Mind" 
 "Don't Give Yourself Away"

1982 EPs
The Brains albums